Maria Tietze (born 24 May 1989) is a German Paralympic athlete and former association soccer player. She was a very keen footballer before she was involved in a motorcycle accident which resulted in her left leg amputated below the knee.

Her highest achievement in Paralympic athletics competitions is finishing at fourth place at the 2018 World Para Athletics European Championships in the women's long jump T64.

References

External links
 
 

1989 births
Living people
German female sprinters
German female long jumpers
German women's footballers
German amputees
Paralympic athletes of Germany
Athletes (track and field) at the 2020 Summer Paralympics
Women's association footballers not categorized by position
Sportspeople from Leverkusen